This is the results breakdown of the local elections held in Extremadura on 3 April 1979. The following tables show detailed results in the autonomous community's most populous municipalities, sorted alphabetically.

City control
The following table lists party control in the most populous municipalities, including provincial capitals (shown in bold).

Municipalities

Almendralejo
Population: 23,123

Badajoz
Population: 110,290

Cáceres
Population: 63,181

Mérida
Population: 39,165

Plasencia
Population: 30,285

References

Extremadura
1979